Avoca Beach is a coastal suburb of the Central Coast region of New South Wales, Australia, about  north of Sydney. Avoca Beach is primarily a residential suburb, Avoca Beach is also a popular tourist destination. Avoca Beach is known for its surfing and state (regional) surf competitions. Avoca Beach village has a variety of restaurants and cafes as well as a post office, newsagent, pharmacy and mini-mart. Avoca Beach also has a historic cinema, a hotel, bowling club, motel and caravan park. It is located within the  local government area.

This suburb is unrelated to the NSW Southern Highlands suburb of Avoca, New South Wales, except in name only.

Geography
It is bordered to the north by the Bulbararing Lagoon, to the west by Saltwater Creek and to the east by the ocean.

History
The area was originally inhabited by the Darkinjung & Awabakal Aboriginal people. "Avoca" is an Irish name meaning "great estuary" or "where the river meets the sea", and is also the name of a town in County Wicklow, Ireland.

On 4 January 1830,  of land in the area were promised to Irish army officer John Moore. However, the official deeds were not issued until 30 September 1839, due to the difficulty in surveying the land. He built a house opposite Bulbararing Lake (now known as Avoca Lake) and planted vines, cereals and fruit trees. He left the area in 1857 for the Victorian goldfields. In the late 19th century, Tom Davis leased the area in order to exploit local timber, which was transported by tram to a mill at Terrigal via what is now Tramway Road in North Avoca.

In the 1950s, commercial buildings began to be built and populated, including bakery, service station, butchery, mini mart, caravan park and the Avoca Beach Picture Theatre.

Residential development in Avoca Beach began during the 20th century, and the area subsequently became a popular holiday retreat with wealthy residents of Sydney's North Shore.

The group claims that the wreck will negatively affect surf conditions, tides, and littoral sand drift, and is concerned over the thoroughness of inspection and removal of dangerous materials and chemicals from the former warship, with the chance that marine life and people could be poisoned. An appeal to the Administrative Appeals Tribunal three days before the planned scuttling date of 27 March led to a postponement of the plan until the residents' claims were investigated. The decision from the Tribunal, in favor of the project going ahead after further cleanup work, was handed down on 15 September 2010, and despite further attempts to delay, Adelaide was scuttled on 13 April 2011.

Demographics
At the ABS 2016 census, Avoca Beach had a population of 4,584 people. 76.4% of people were born in Australia. The next most common country of birth was England at 8.9%. 90.9% of people only spoke English at home. The most common responses for religion in Avoca Beach were No Religion 34.0%, Catholic 22.5% and Anglican 19.9%.

Avoca Beach residents had a median age of 41, compared with the median of 42 for the Central Coast local government area. Median individual incomes in Avoca Beach were above average for the region — $764 per week compared with $600 per week. The 2016 Census reported 1,527 occupied private dwellings, of which 83.3% were separate houses, and the median monthly housing loan repayment of $2,167 was well above the regional average of $1,750.

In 2020, Avoca Beach's median house price was $1,150,000 versus $940,000 for the Central Coast region.

Education
Avoca Beach has a state primary school, which first opened in 1935. The suburb is within Kincumber High School's catchment area.

Politics
At federal level, Avoca Beach is within the Division of Robertson. In the Federal election of May 2022 it was won by Gordon Reid of the Australian Labor Party, previously held for nine years by Lucy Wicks of the Liberal Party of Australia.

In the New South Wales Legislative Assembly, Avoca Beach is within the electorate of Terrigal, currently held by Adam Crouch of the Liberal Party.

Polling place statistics are presented below from the Avoca Beach polling place in the elections leading up to and including the 2019 federal and state elections as indicated.

Gallery

References

Further reading

External links
 DCP 159 - Character Statement for Avoca (Gosford City Council)
 Artificial Reef Dive (NSW Dept of Lands)

Suburbs of the Central Coast (New South Wales)